Rahul Gandhi (born 19 June 1970) is an Indian politician and a member of the Indian Parliament, representing the constituency of Wayanad, Kerala in the 17th Lok Sabha. A member of the Indian National Congress, he served as the president of the Indian National Congress from 16 December 2017 to 3 July 2019. Gandhi is the chairperson of the Indian Youth Congress, the National Students Union of India also a trustee of Rajiv Gandhi Foundation and the Rajiv Gandhi Charitable Trust.

Born in New Delhi, Gandhi spent his early childhood between Delhi and Dehradun and stayed away from the public sphere for much of his childhood and early youth. He attained primary education in New Delhi and Dehradun but was later homeschooled because of security concerns. Gandhi began his undergraduate career at St. Stephen's College before moving to Harvard University. Gandhi transferred to Rollins College in Florida due to security threats following the assassination of his father, the late Prime Minister Rajiv Gandhi. He graduated in 1994. The next year, Gandhi obtained his M.Phil. from Cambridge. Post-graduation, he began his professional career with the Monitor Group, a management consulting firm in London. He soon returned to India and established the Mumbai-based technology outsourcing firm, Backops Services Private Ltd.

In 2004, Gandhi announced to enter active politics and successfully contested the general elections held that year from Amethi, a seat that was earlier held by his father; he won again from the constituency in 2009 and 2014. Amidst calls from Congress party veterans for his greater involvement in party politics and national government, Gandhi was elected Congress Vice-President in 2013, having served as the General Secretary previously. Gandhi led the Congress's campaign in the 2014 Indian general elections; the party suffered its worst electoral result in its history, winning only 44 seats compared to 206 seats won previously in the 2009 general election.

In 2017, Gandhi succeeded his mother as Congress party leader and led the Congress into the 2019 Indian general election. The Indian National Congress won 52 seats, failing to get 10% of the seats needed to claim the post of Leader of Opposition. After this poor performance in the election, Gandhi resigned as party leader and was succeeded by his mother, Sonia Gandhi.

Early life and background

Gandhi was born in Delhi on 19 June 1970, as the first of the two children of Rajiv Gandhi, who later became the prime minister of India, and Italian-born Sonia Gandhi (née Maino), who later became the president of Indian National Congress, and as the grandson of Prime Minister Indira Gandhi. His paternal grandfather Feroze Gandhi was a Parsi from Gujarat. He is also the great-grandson of India's first prime minister, Jawaharlal Nehru. Priyanka Vadra is his younger sister and Robert Vadra is his brother-in-law. 

Gandhi attended St. Columba's School, Delhi before entering the all-boys' boarding The Doon School in Dehradun (also the alma mater of his father, Rajiv Gandhi) from 1981 to 1983. Meanwhile, his father joined politics and became the prime minister on 31 October 1984 when Indira Gandhi was assassinated. Due to the security threats faced by Indira Gandhi's family from Sikh extremists, Gandhi, and his sister, Priyanka was home-schooled thereafter.

Gandhi joined St. Stephen's College, Delhi (an affiliated college of the University of Delhi) in 1989 for his undergraduate education but moved to Harvard University after he completed the first year examinations. In 1991, after Rajiv Gandhi was assassinated by the Tamil Tigers (LTTE) during an election rally, he shifted to Rollins College in  Florida, USA, supposedly due to security concerns and obtained his B.A. in 1994. During his time at Rollins, he assumed the pseudonym Raul Vinci and his identity was known only to the university officials and security agencies. He further went on to obtain an M.Phil. from Trinity College, Cambridge in 1995.

Before joining politics, Gandhi, worked at the Monitor Group, a management consulting firm, in London for three years. In 2002, Gandhi returned to India and set up his technology consultancy viz. Backops Services Private Ltd in Mumbai, where he was one of the directors of the firm. He then opened BackOps UK, a firm which used to acquire defence contracts from foreign companies that supplied to the Indian armed forces. Subramanian Swamy pointed out that Rahul Gandhi declared himself as British citizen in the company's filings but the Congress party said that it was a yearly mistake. Gandhi has been a strong proponent of harnessing the scale and dexterity that technology can lend while amplifying the power of citizens.

Political career

Formative years

In March 2004, Gandhi announced his entry into politics by announcing that he would contest the May 2004 elections, standing for his father's former constituency of Amethi in Uttar Pradesh in the Lok Sabha, India's lower house of Parliament. His mother had held the seat until she transferred to the neighboring seat of Raebareli. The Congress had been doing poorly in Uttar Pradesh, holding only 10 of the 80 Lok Sabha seats in the state at the time. At the time, this move generated surprise among political commentators, who had regarded his sister Priyanka Gandhi as being the more charismatic and likely to succeed. It generated speculation that the presence of a young member of India's most famous political family would reinvigorate the Congress party's political fortunes among India's youthful population In his first interview with foreign media, Gandhi portrayed himself as an uniter of the country and condemned "divisive" politics in India, saying that he would try to reduce caste and religious tensions. Gandhi won, retaining the family stronghold with a victory margin of over 100,000. Until 2006, he held no other office. Gandhi and his sister, Priyanka Gandhi managed their mother's campaign for re-election to Raebareilly in 2006, which was won with a victory margin of over 400,000 votes. He was a prominent figure in the Congress campaign for the 2007 Uttar Pradesh Assembly elections; Congress, however, won only 22 seats of the 403 seats with 8.53% of votes.

Gandhi was appointed General Secretary of the All India Congress Committee on 24 September 2007 in a reshuffle of the party secretariat. In the same reshuffle, he was also given charge of the Indian Youth Congress and the National Students Union of India. In 2008, senior Congress leader Veerappa Moily mentioned "Rahul-as-PM" idea when the PM of India Manmohan Singh was still abroad. He was elevated to the position of the vice-president of the party in January 2013.

Youth politics
In September 2007 when he was appointed general secretary in charge of the Indian Youth Congress (IYC) and the National Students Union of India (NSUI), Gandhi promised to reform youth politics. In his attempt to prove himself thus, in November 2008 Gandhi held interviews at his 12 Tughlak Lane residence in New Delhi to handpick at least 40 people who will make up the think-tank of the Indian Youth Congress (IYC), an organization that he has been keen to transform since he was appointed general secretary in September 2007.

Under Gandhi, the IYC and NSUI have seen a dramatic increase in members from 200,000 to 2.5 million. The Indian Express wrote in 2011, "Three years later, as another organizational reshuffle is in the offing, Gandhi's dream remains unrealized with party veterans manipulating internal elections in the Youth Congress and a host of people with questionable background gaining entry into it."

General election (2009)

In the 2009 Indian general election, Gandhi retained his Amethi seat by defeating his nearest rival by a margin of over 370,000 votes. Gandhi was credited with the Congress revival in Uttar Pradesh where they won 21 out of the total 80 Lok Sabha seats. He spoke at 125 rallies across the country in six weeks. The nationwide elections defied the predictions made by pre-poll predictions and exit polls and gave a clear mandate to the incumbent Congress-led UPA government.

In May 2011, Gandhi was arrested by the Uttar Pradesh Police at Bhatta Parsaul village after he turned out in support of agitating farmers demanding more compensation for their land being acquired for a highway project. Gandhi was taken away from the protest site and later given bail and dropped off at the Delhi-UP border.

2012 Assembly elections
Gandhi campaigned during the 2012 Assembly elections in the politically crucial Uttar Pradesh election for almost two months, holding 200 rallies. However, Congress ranked as the fourth party in the state, winning 28 seats, an increase of six seats from the previous 2007 elections. Out of the 15 seats in the Amethi parliamentary constituency, Congress won two.

Congress activists defended the result in Uttar Pradesh, saying "there's a big difference between state elections and national polls and in the end, there is only the first family, a hope and a prayer", and pointing out the turn around attributed to Gandhi in the 2009 Lok Sabha national elections in the state. However, Gandhi publicly accepted responsibility for the result in an interview after the result was declared.

In the Gujarat assembly elections held later in the year, Gandhi was not made the head of the election campaign. This was seen and regarded by opponents as an admission of defeat and was termed as a tactic to avoid the blame of defeat. Congress won 57 seats in the assembly of 182, which was 2 less than the previous elections in 2007. Later in bypolls, Congress lost 4 more seats to BJP.

General election (2014)

Gandhi contested the 2014 Indian general election from his constituency, Amethi, and led the election campaign of the Indian National Congress. Gandhi held the Amethi seat by defeating his nearest rival, BJP's Smriti Irani, by a reduced margin of 107,000 votes. Under his leadership, the Indian National Congress suffered its worst-ever performance in elections and won only 44 seats compared to 206 seats won previously in the 2009 general election. The Congress-led United Progressive Alliance (UPA) also had its worst-ever performance in elections and won only 59 seats compared to 262 seats won previously in the 2009 general election. After the defeat, Gandhi offered to resign his posts, only to be rejected by the party's working committee.

Post-general election

National Herald corruption case
In the National Herald corruption case, the Delhi High Court dismissed the appeals of Sonia Gandhi, and five others which included Motilal Vora, Oscar Fernandes, Suman Dubey, and Satyan Pitroda in December 2015, and ordered them to appear in person before the trial court on 9 December. In 2016, the Supreme Court of India granted an exemption to Gandhi accused in the case. The Congress party, raised objections to the complaint filed by Subramanian Swamy, labelling it as “politically motivated”.

General election (2019)

Gandhi used the slogan "Chowkidar Chor Hai" as a jibe against Narendra Modi, BJP's Prime Ministerial candidate for the 2019 Indian general election. The slogan was aimed at Modi about the alleged irregularities and favoritism in awarding the contracts for the Rafale fighter jet deal. The said case was considered by the Supreme Court of India and after carefully going through all the evidence, the high court dismissed the case and exonerated the current government of India.

Gandhi led the election campaign of the Indian National Congress party. Under his leadership, the party improved its seat count from 44 out of 543 in 2014 to 52 out of 542 in 2019. It also boosted its vote from 19.3% to 19.5% in 2019. The Indian National Congress won 52 seats, failing to get 10% of the seats needed to claim the post of Leader of Opposition. After this poor performance in the election, Gandhi resigned as party leader and was succeeded by his mother, Sonia Gandhi. Gandhi contested the 2019 Lok Sabha election from two constituencies, Amethi, Uttar Pradesh and Wayanad, Kerala. Gandhi won the Wayanad seat in the 2019 general elections with over 60 percent vote share. However, he lost his existing seat of Amethi to the former soap opera actress Smriti Irani of the BJP by a margin of 55,120 votes.

Bharat Jodo Yatra (2022–2023)

Bharat Jodo Yatra, literally a ‘unite India march’ was started by Rahul Gandhi on September 7, 2022. Starting from Kanyakumari to reach Kashmir, the march covered  in nearly five months across 12 States and two Union Territories. During the march, the INC elected a new party president and also won a majority in the 2022 Himachal Pradesh Legislative Assembly election, its first majority it won by itself since 2018.

Electoral performances

Positions held
Gandhi has held the following positions;

Within party

Political and social views

National security

In December 2010 during the United States diplomatic cables leak, WikiLeaks leaked a cable dated 3 August 2009, where the Prime Minister of India, Manmohan Singh had hosted a lunch on 20 July 2009 for Gandhi, then the General Secretary of the AICC. One of the guests who was invited for the lunch was the United States Ambassador to India, Timothy J. Roemer. In a "candid conversation" with Roemer, he said that he believes Hindu extremists pose a greater threat to his country than Muslim militants. Gandhi referred specifically to more-polarising figures in the Bharatiya Janata Party. Also responding to the ambassador's query about the activities in the region by the Islamist militant organization Lashkar-e-Taiba (LeT), Gandhi said there was evidence of some support for the group among certain elements in India's indigenous Muslim population. In a response to this, the BJP heavily criticized Gandhi for his statements. BJP spokesperson Ravi Shankar Prasad slammed Gandhi, saying that his language was a bigger threat to India, dividing the people of the country on communal grounds. Speaking to reporters, Prasad said, "In one stroke Mr. Rahul Gandhi has sought to give a big leverage to the propaganda to all the extremist and terrorist groups in Pakistan, and also some segments of the Pakistani establishment. It would also seriously compromise India's fight against terror as also our strategic security. "Adding that terrorism has no religion, he said that Rahul Gandhi had shown his lack of understanding India. Gandhi has also been critical of groups like the RSS and has compared them to terrorist organizations like SIMI.After the 2013 Muzaffarnagar riots, at a Madhya Pradesh election rally in Indore, Gandhi claimed that a police officer told him that Pakistan's ISI was trying to recruit disgruntled riot-affected youngsters. However, the district administration, the UP state government, the Union Home Ministry, the Research and Analysis Wing (RAW) and the Intelligence Bureau (IB) denied any such development. This remark drew heavy criticism from various political outfits such as BJP, SP, CPI and JD(U). Congress's Jairam Ramesh said Gandhi needed to apologise to the Muslim community for this remark. In reply to the ECI's show-cause notice to explain why action should not be initiated against him for violating the Model Code of Conduct, Gandhi said that he didn't intend to exploit communal sentiments but was referring to divisive politics.
The BJP also asked the government to explain why Gandhi, who holds no post in the government, is being briefed by intelligence officers on important security issues. On 13 November 2013, the Election Commission of India found Gandhi's explanation to be insufficient conveyed its displeasure and advised him to be more circumspect in his public utterances during election campaigns.

Lokpal
Gandhi opines that the Lokpal should be made a constitutional body and it should be made accountable to the Parliament, just like the Election Commission of India. He opined that Lokpal alone cannot root out corruption, rather a strong political will is needed to remove corruption. This statement came out on 25 August 2011, on the 10th day of Anna Hazare's fast. Gandhi's statement was considered a delaying tactic by the opposition and Team Anna's members. It was consequently slammed by opposition leaders Sushma Swaraj and Arun Jaitley. The Parliamentary Standing Committee led by Abhishek Manu Singhvi tabled the Jan Lokpal Bill report in the Rajya Sabha on 9 December 2011. The report recommended the Lokpal be made into a constitutional body.

Farmers' and Land Agitation

On 19 April 2015 Gandhi addressed the farmer and worker's rally, named as Kisan Khet Mazdoor Rally in Ramlila Maidan. Here he made "references to his agitations in Niyamgiri in Orissa and Bhatta-Parsaul in Greater Noida in Uttar Pradesh". The rally was attended by 1 lakh people. In the speech he gave, he criticizeda the Indian prime minister Narendra Modi about his comment in Toronto where he said that he was "cleaning the mess created by previous governments". He also said "Do you know how Modi won the election?.. He borrowed thousands of crores from industrialists for his several campaigns and advertisements. How will he pay them back? He will pay them back with your land. He will give your land to his industrialist friends."

He razzed the government as a "suit-boot government", a reference to Modi's monogrammed suit which he wore in the Republic Day meeting with Barack Obama. Moreover, he used the "acche din government" jibe (which was Modi's election campaign slogan meaning "good days government") and mentioned that it had "failed the country".

A land bill was introduced by the BJP government in the parliament in May which was criticized by the opposition parties. Accusing the government of "murdering" UPA's land bill, Gandhi promised to prevent the bill from being passed, if not in the parliament then would "stop you [ BJP government] on streets". He further accused the government of diluting the bill and called it "anti-farmer". Gandhi also drew a parallel between "daylight robbery" and the bill. On 26 May, the day of the Modi government's first anniversary, Gandhi commented at a rally in Kozhikode "Unfortunately, birthday celebrations is only for a few powerful friends of the government. Kisan, farmers and mazdoor have nothing to celebrate."

Women's and LGBT rights
Gandhi has pushed for the empowerment of women. He backed the Women's Reservation Bill which would allow 33% reservation of all Lok Sabha and state legislative assembly seats for women. This bill passed the Rajya Sabha on 9 March 2010 but has not yet been voted on by the Lok Sabha as of February 2014. A strong advocate of women's rights and empowerment, Gandhi has called for 33% reservation of all parliamentary Lok Sabha and state legislative assembly seats for women, as well as government jobs. Gandhi had backed the repeal of Section 377 of the Indian Penal Code and the decriminalization of homosexuality.

Bharat Jodo Yatra

Rahul Gandhi launched the yatra on 7 September 2022 at Kanyakumari after paying tributes to his late father Rajiv Gandhi, Swami Vivekananda, and the Tamil poet Thiruvalluvar. The Congress said the yatra was "India's biggest mass contact program", during which the concerns of the people will reach Delhi. After unfurling the tricolour flag at the Srinagar's historic Lal Chowk, which marked the end of 137-day-long foot march from Kanyakumari to Kashmir, Congress leader Rahul Gandhi said that the Bharat Jodo Yatra has given an alternative vision of the politics to the country. Rahul Gandhi unfurled that national flag at the historic clock tower and sang the national anthem to send a strong message of nationalism.

Climate Change 
Rahul Gandhi has been very concerned about the environmental degradation of the world and has said that unless they are not made a political issue,they won't get the attention they deserve.

Rahul Gandhi criticized Environment Impact Assessment (EIA) 2020 draft by calling it "dangerous" and said that it's long term consequences will be harmful. Calling it a disaster, he said that it will silence the communities who will get directly impacted by environmental degradation.

Economic Issues 
Rahul Gandhi views the economic policies of Modi Government as fundamentally to benefit the 2-3 billionaires and has described them as crony capitalists. Calling the "crony capitalists" as best friends of Modi, he has been critical of the privatization of government assets. He is of the view that RSS and crony capitalists are colluding to control India. He has been specifically harsh on Indian Billionaire Gautam Adani and said that Modi Government has been very favourable towards Adani. He sees the rise of Adani as a direct consequence of crony capitalism. He said that he is not anti-business and supports fairness. Disagreeing with privatization of PSUs,he said that Congress will not allow the privatization if it comes to power. Citing the report on inequality by Oxfam, he said that rising economic inequality is the result of Modi Government's economic policies.

Demonetization 
Rahul Gandhi has been very critical of the Modi government's demonetization of ₹500 and ₹1,000 banknotes of the Mahatma Gandhi Series. He said that demonetization is a fundamental failure of policy design and has alleged that it was a deliberate move by "PayPM" to help 2-3 billionaires to monopolize the economy. Terming demonetisation as the country’s “biggest scam”, he said that it was a attack on traders and asserted that demonetization rendered millions jobless.

References

Further reading

External links

 
 Profile  at Indian National Congress
 Biography Profile at Lok Sabha, Parliament of India

|-

|-

|-

 
India MPs 2004–2009
India MPs 2009–2014
India MPs 2014–2019
India MPs 2019–present
1970 births
Alumni of Trinity College, Cambridge
Children of prime ministers of India
Harvard University alumni
Indian Hindus
Indian National Congress politicians
Indian people of Italian descent
Living people
Lok Sabha members from Uttar Pradesh
Nehru–Gandhi family
People from New Delhi
Rollins College alumni
St. Columba's School, Delhi alumni
The Doon School alumni
Delhi University alumni
People from Delhi
Kashmiri Brahmins
Indian Youth Congress Presidents
Indian National Congress (Organisation) politicians
National Students' Union of India
Lok Sabha members from Kerala
United Progressive Alliance candidates in the 2009 Indian general election
United Progressive Alliance candidates in the 2014 Indian general election
United Progressive Alliance candidates in the 2019 Indian general election
Indian National Congress politicians from Uttar Pradesh
Gandhians
Kashmiri people
21st-century Indian politicians
20th-century Indian politicians
People charged with corruption